The Modern Language Association of America, often referred to as the Modern Language Association (MLA), is widely considered the principal professional association in the United States for scholars of language and literature. The MLA aims to "strengthen the study and teaching of language and literature". The organization includes over 25,000 members in 100 countries, primarily academic scholars, professors, and graduate students who study or teach language and literature, including English, other modern languages, and comparative literature. Although founded in the United States, with offices in New York City, the MLA's membership, concerns, reputation, and influence are international in scope.

History

The MLA was founded in 1883, as a discussion and advocacy group for the study of literature and modern languages (that is, all but classical languages, such as ancient Latin and Greek). According to its profile featured by the American Council of Learned Societies (ACLS), "The Modern Language Association is formed for educational, scientific, literary, and social objects and purposes, and more specifically for the promotion of the academic and scientific study of English, German, French, Spanish, Italian, and other so-called modern languages and literatures."

Officers and governance
The officers of the MLA are elected by its members. The 2019–2020 president was Simon Gikandi, the first vice-president was Judith Butler and the second vice-president was Barbara Fuchs. The 2020–2021 president is Judith Butler.

The MLA is governed by an Executive Council, elected periodically by its members, according to the MLA Constitution. The Executive Director is Paula Krebs.

Activities
The MLA publishes several academic journals, including Publications of the Modern Language Association of America (abbreviated as PMLA), one of the most prestigious journals in literary studies, and Profession, which is now published online on MLA Commons and discusses professional issues faced by teachers of language and literature. The association also publishes the MLA Handbook, a guide that is geared toward high school and undergraduate students and has sold more than 6,500,000 copies.  The MLA produces the online database, MLA International Bibliography, the standard bibliography in language and literature.

Since 1884 the MLA has held a national, four-day convention. Beginning in 2011, the convention dates moved to the first Thursday following 2 January. Approximately eight to twelve thousand members attend, depending on the location, which alternates among major cities in various regions of the United States. The MLA Annual Convention is the largest and most important of the year for scholars of languages and literature. Language departments of many universities and colleges interview candidates for teaching positions at the convention, although hiring occurs all year long. The organization's Job Information List (JIL) is available online.

In addition to its job-placement activities, the convention features about 800 sessions, including presentations of papers and panel discussions on diverse topics (special sessions, forums, poetry readings, film presentations, interdisciplinary studies involving art and music, governance meetings) and social events hosted by English and language departments and allied or affiliated organizations. There are also extensive book exhibits in one of the main hotel or convention center exhibition areas.

In November 2016, the association launched Humanities Commons, an open-access, crossdisciplinary hub for anyone interested in humanities research and scholarship. Other not-for-profit organizations involved in this project include College Art Association; Association for Jewish Studies; and the Association for Slavic, East European, and Eurasian Studies.

The MLA's Web site features the MLA Language Map, which presents overviews and detailed data from the United States 2000 Census about the locations and numbers of speakers of thirty languages and seven groups of less commonly spoken languages in the United States and Canada.

The association has highlighted issues such as race, gender and class in its professional deliberations. In The New Criterion, a classicist and politically conservative magazine, Roger Kimball and Hilton Kramer argued that this was part of a "rampant politicization of literary study that the MLA has aggressively supported" in American colleges and universities, including elevating popular culture to a position of parity with great works of literature as subjects for classroom study, and other "radical" postures.

Proposed academic boycott of Israel 
On January 7, 2017, the MLA rejected a proposed boycott of Israeli academic institutions in a 113-79 vote during its annual meeting in Philadelphia. Activists within the association had since 2014 pushed for such a boycott because they believed Israel was guilty of human rights violations and should be subjected to a boycott similarly to how South Africa was boycotted by the Anti-Apartheid Movement. The inspiration for the boycott came from the Boycott, Divestment and Sanctions (BDS) movement which is a global movement that calls for comprehensive boycotts of Israel. 

The activists calling themselves MLA Members for Justice in Palestine presented a resolution in December 2016 calling for a boycott. The call to boycott received support from scholars such as Judith Butler and novelist Viet Thanh Nguyen, but also opposition from scholars such as Cary Nelson and historian Kenneth Waltzer as well as a group calling itself MLA Members for Scholars Rights. A group of Israeli scholars sent videotaped messages describing the multicultural reality of Israeli universities and explaining the harassment to which Israeli scholars, in Israel and abroad, have been subjected through repeated BDS campaigns to slander and ostracize them.  On the other side of the debate, another group of Israeli scholars came out in support of the boycott, arguing that "the Israel-led campaign against the boycott of Israeli academic institutions rallies around the claim that if adapted it will hurt progressive Israeli scholars. Campaigners use this tactic to divert attention from the plight of the entire Palestinian population living under Israel's elaborate system of colonial repression and injustice to a manufactured victimization of Israeli academics. This is a manipulative inversion of victimhood." 

In a strongly worded letter, the pro-Israeli Brandeis Center threatened to sue MLA if the resolution was adopted. In the letter addressed to the association's President Kwame Anthony Appiah and Executive Director Rosemary G. Feal, the Center claimed that the resolution was ultra vires. That is, that it would take the association in a direction that went beyond its original mission. Supporters of the boycott argued that it was not ultra vires because the Association had in the past been engaged in human rights issues.

Regional associations
There are several regional associations that are independent of the primary MLA, and which host smaller conventions at other times of the year:
 Midwest Modern Language Association
 Northeast Modern Language Association
 Pacific Ancient and Modern Language Association
 Rocky Mountain Modern Language Association
 South Atlantic Modern Language Association
 South Central Modern Language Association

Affiliated and allied societies
Association of Departments of English
Association of Departments of Foreign Languages
Society for Medieval Feminist Scholarship
The International Federation for Modern Languages and Literatures (FILLM)

See also
List of most commonly learned foreign languages in the United States
MLA Handbook
MLA Style Manual
Style guide

References

Further reading
 Barber, Virginia. "The Women's Revolt in the MLA". Change Magazine April 1972. Rpt. in Women on Campus: The Unfinished Liberation. Ed. George W. Bonham. Introd. Elizabeth Janeway. Somerset, NJ: Transaction, 2006. pp. 85–94. ["The Modern Language Association is finally opening its doors to professional women and their demands for reform."]
 Howe, Florence, Frederick C. Crews, Louis Kampf, Noam Chomsky, Paul Lauter, and Richard Ohmann. "Reforming the MLA." Letter to the editor. New York Review of Books, 19 December 1968. Web. 4 February 2007.
Kimball, Roger. Tenured Radicals: How Politics Has Corrupted Our Higher Education. New York: Harper & Row, 1990. Rev. ed. Chicago: Elephant Paperbacks (Ivan R. Dee), 1998. . . Print.
Kushner, Eva. "The Modern Language Association of America". Diogenes 50.2 (2003): 135-138. Web. 1 July 2016.

External links

 Publications of the Modern Language Association of America, 1884–1922, full text online via HathiTrust

Organizations established in 1883
1883 establishments in the United States
Learned societies of the United States
Bibliographic database providers
Member organizations of the American Council of Learned Societies